Nancy McCredie (February 5, 1945 – May 1, 2021) was a Canadian female track and field athlete. During her athletic career, she won three gold medals at the Pan American Games and one bronze medal at the Commonwealth Games. McCredie was awarded the Velma Springstead Trophy as the best Canadian female athlete of the year in 1963.

Career
McCredie claimed two gold medals at the 1963 Pan American Games in Brazil and was awarded the Velma Springstead Trophy. McCredie also represented her native country of Canada in two events (discus and shot put) at the 1964 Summer Olympics in Tokyo, Japan.

In 1966, McCredie reported that she was going to retire from sports. At the time of her announcement, she was singing alongside the Benny Louis Orchestra. Before her retirement, McCredie won two final medals in shot put. She was awarded a bronze medal at the 1966 British Empire and Commonwealth Games and a gold at the 1967 Pan American Games. McCredie officially retired in 1968, stating a knee injury as her reason for retirement. During her career, she held the Canadian record in shot put and discus.

In 2001, McCredie moved to Bristol, Quebec and became an artist.

Awards and achievements
In 1968, McCredie was inducted into the Canadian Olympic Hall of Fame. She was also added to the Brampton Sports Hall of Fame in 1983 and the Athletics Ontario Hall of Fame in 2016.

McCredie lived in Brampton during the height of her athletic career, and became the namesake of Nancy McCredie Drive and Nancy McCredie Park.

References

1945 births
2021 deaths
Athletes (track and field) at the 1963 Pan American Games
Athletes (track and field) at the 1964 Summer Olympics
Athletes (track and field) at the 1966 British Empire and Commonwealth Games
Athletes (track and field) at the 1967 Pan American Games
Commonwealth Games bronze medallists for Canada
Pan American Games gold medalists for Canada
Canadian female discus throwers
Canadian female shot putters
Olympic track and field athletes of Canada
Sportspeople from Belleville, Ontario
Sportspeople from Ontario
Commonwealth Games medallists in athletics
Pan American Games medalists in athletics (track and field)
Medalists at the 1963 Pan American Games
Medalists at the 1967 Pan American Games
Medallists at the 1966 British Empire and Commonwealth Games